The Gberedou/ Hamana region of Guinea is located roughly 50 km to the northeast of Kouroussa and 40 km southwest of Kankan. The area has exceptional spiritual significance as it harbors a traditional Mandingo religious milieu.  In addition, the Gberedou/ Hamana region supports a unique architectural style of residential structures.

Site Description 
Baro, Koumana, and Balato are the three principal villages of the region, but sacred pools are also important components of the cultural landscape where grand ceremonies are performed every year.

World Heritage Status 
This site was added to the UNESCO World Heritage Tentative List on March 29, 2001 in the Cultural category.

Notes

References
Architecture vernaculaire et paysage culturel mandingue du Gberedou/Hamana - UNESCO World Heritage Centre Accessed 2009-02-27.

Regions of Guinea

Geography of Guinea